Drennen is an unincorporated community in Nicholas County, West Virginia, United States. Drennen has a post office with ZIP code 26667.

Located near Drennen is the Mason-Drennen House, listed on the National Register of Historic Places in 1998.

References

Unincorporated communities in Nicholas County, West Virginia
Unincorporated communities in West Virginia